is one of the largest keiretsu in Japan and one of the largest corporate groups in the world.

The major companies of the group include Mitsui & Co. (general trading company), Sumitomo Mitsui Banking Corporation, Nippon Paper Industries, Pokka Sapporo Holdings, Toray Industries, Mitsui Chemicals, Isetan Mitsukoshi Holdings, Sumitomo Mitsui Trust Holdings, Mitsui Engineering & Shipbuilding, Mitsui O.S.K. Lines and Mitsui Fudosan.

History

Edo period origins

Founded by Mitsui Takatoshi (1622–1694), who was the fourth son of a shopkeeper in Matsusaka, in what is now today's Mie prefecture. From his shop, called Echigoya (越後屋), Mitsui Takatoshi's father originally sold miso and ran a pawn shop business. Later, the family would open a second shop in Edo (now called Tokyo).

Takatoshi moved to Edo when he was 14 years old, and later  his older brother joined him. Sent back to Matsutaka by his brother, Takatoshi waited for 24 years until his older brother died before he could take over the family shop, Echigoya. He opened a new branch in 1673; a large gofukuya (kimono shop) in Nihonbashi, a district in the heart of Edo. This genesis of Mitsui's business history began in the Enpō era, which was a nengō meaning "Prolonged Wealth".

In time, the gofukuya division separated from Mitsui, and is now called Mitsukoshi. Traditionally, gofukuyas provided products made to order; a visit was made to the customer's house (typically a person of high social class or who was successful in business), an order taken, then fulfilled. The system of accountancy was called "margin transaction".  Mitsui changed this by producing products first, then selling them directly at his shop for cash. At the time, this was an unfamiliar mode of operation in Japan. Even as the shop began providing dry goods to the government of the city of Edo, cash sales were not yet a widespread business practice.

At about this time, Edo's government had struck a business deal with Osaka. Osaka would sell crops and other material to pay its land tax. The money was then sent to Edo—but moving money was dangerous in middle feudal Japan. In 1683, the shogunate granted permission for money exchanges (ryōgaeten) to be established in Edo.  The Mitsui "exchange shops" facilitated transfers and mitigated that known risk.

Formation of Mitsui zaibatsu
After the Meiji Restoration, Mitsui was among the enterprises that were able to expand to become zaibatsu not simply because they were already big and rich at the start of modern industrial development. Firms like Mitsui and Sumitomo were led by non-family managers such as Minomura Rizaemon, who guided the business by accurately forecasting the coming political and economic situations, by acquaintance with high-ranking government officials or politicians, and bold investment.

Mitsui's main business in the early period was drapery, finance, and trade, the first two being the businesses it inherited from the Tokugawa Era. It entered into mining because it acquired a mine as collateral from the loan it had made, and partly because it could buy a mine cheaply from the government, Mitsui then diversified to become the biggest business in pre-war Japan. The diversification was made mainly into related fields to take advantage of accumulated capabilities; for instance, the trading company entered into chemicals to attain forward integration.

On July 1, 1876, Mitsui Bank, Japan's first private bank, was founded with Takashi Masuda (1848–1938) as its president. Mitsui Bank, which following a merger with Taiyō-Kobe Bank in the mid-1980s became part of Sakura Bank, survives as part of the Sumitomo Mitsui Banking Corporation. During the early 20th century, Mitsui was one of the largest zaibatsu, operating in numerous fields.

Mitsui Bank became the holding company of the Mitsui zaibatsu from 1876. It was joined as an ultimate parent company by Mitsui & Co. and Mitsui Mining in 1900, with various industrial concerns owned by various combinations of these companies and their subsidiaries.

Likewise, Mitsui invested in maritime transportation to support its trading activities as well as invest in passenger transportation, first with the creation in 1878, of Osaka Shosen Kaisha (OSK), which was merged with Mitsui Steamship in 1964, to become Mitsui OSK Lines (MOL), which is today one of the largest ocean shipping groups in the world.

When the United Kingdom withdrew from the gold standard in 1931, during the height of the Great Depression, Mitsui Bank and Mitsui & Co. were found to have speculated around the transaction. This raised a political furor in Japan and resulted in the assassination of Mitsui executive Takuma Dan.

World War II
During the 1930s and '40s, the subsidiary tobacco industry of Mitsui had started production of special "Golden Bat" cigarettes using the then-popular in the Far East trademark. Their circulation was prohibited in Japan and was used only for export. Local Japanese secret service kempetai under the controversial Imperial Japanese Army General Kenji Doihara had the control of their distribution in China and Manchuria where the production exported. Within the mouthpiece were small discreet doses of opium or heroin, and consequently millions of unsuspecting consumers became addicted to these narcotics, while huge profits were created for the company. The mastermind of the plan, Doihara, was later prosecuted and convicted for war crimes before the International Military Tribunal for the Far East, sentenced to death; but no actions ever took place against the company which profited from their production. According to testimony presented at the Tokyo War Crimes trials in 1948, the revenue from the narcotization policy in China, including Manchukuo, was estimated in 20 million to 30 million yen per year, while another authority stated that the annual revenue was estimated by the Japanese military at US$300 million a year.

During the Second World War, Mitsui employed American prisoners of war as slave laborers, some of whom were maimed by Mitsui employees.

Postwar development as keiretsu
In 1947 and 1948, the Supreme Commander Allied Powers pressed the Japanese government to dismantle the ten largest zaibatsu conglomerates, including Mitsui. The Mitsui Group, now broken into many separate companies, reorganized itself as a horizontal coalition of independent companies in the 1950s, once the occupation of Japan had ended and some of the smaller companies were allowed to re-coalesce. The central firms in the keiretsu became Mitsui Bank and Mitsui & Co.

Mitsui lagged somewhat behind its rivals Mitsubishi and Sumitomo Group in reorganization. Mitsui Bank, which should have been the mainstay and principal capital provider of the group, declined in size due to the collapse of the Imperial Bank after the war, which resulted in reduced cohesion of the conglomerate. Many companies that were once part of the Mitsui Group have become independent or tied to other conglomerates. Specifically, Toshiba, Toyota Motors, and Suntory, once part of the Mitsui Group, became independent, with the Toyota Group becoming a conglomerate in its own right.

In 2000, Mitsui Pharmaceuticals was acquired by the German Schering AG from Berlin.

Ishikawajima-Harima Heavy Industries (IHI Corporation) is now considered to be part of the Mizuho Group, and many companies in the Sumitomo Mitsui Financial Group are now more closely tied to the Sumitomo Group than the Mitsui Group. Recently there have been signs that Mitsubishi UFJ Financial Group and the Mitsubishi Group could be taking over other parts of the Sumitomo Mitsui Financial Group. Mitsukoshi merged into Isetan, a major department store with close ties to the Bank of Tokyo-Mitsubishi UFJ, to form Isetan Mitsukoshi Holdings in April 2008.

Makeup of the Mitsui Group
Companies currently associated with the Mitsui keiretsu include Mitsui & Co., Sumitomo Mitsui Trust Holdings, Japan Steel Works, Mitsui Chemicals, Mitsui Construction Co., Mitsui Engineering & Shipbuilding, Mitsui Fudosan, Mitsui-gold, Mitsui Mining & Smelting Co., Ltd., Mitsui Oil Exploration Co. (MOECO), Mitsui O.S.K. Lines, Mitsui Petrochemical Industries Ltd, Mitsui-Soko, Mitsui Sumitomo Insurance Group, Nippon Paper Industries, Pacific Coast Recycling, Sumitomo Mitsui Banking Corporation, Taiheiyo Cement, Tokyo Broadcasting System, Toray Industries, Toshiba Corporation, Tri-net Logistics Management, and Mitsui Commodity Risk Management (MCRM).

Mitsui companies which are in the Nikkei 225 

 Aim Services Co., Ltd
 Denka
 Isetan Mitsukoshi Holdings
 JA Mitsui Leasing
 Japan Steel Works
 Mitsui & Co.
 Mitsui Chemicals
 Mitsui Engineering & Shipbuilding
 Mitsui Fudosan
 Mitsui Life Insurance Co.
 Mitsui Mining & Smelting Co., Ltd.
 Mitsui O.S.K. Lines
 Mitsui Sumitomo Insurance Group
 Mitsui-Soko Holdings
 Nippon Paper Industries
 Nihon Unisys
 Sanki Engineering
 Sapporo Brewery
 Shin Nippon Air Technologies
 Sumitomo Mitsui Banking Corporation
 Sumitomo Mitsui Construction
 Sumitomo Mitsui Financial Group
 Sumitomo Mitsui Trust Holdings
 Tokyo Broadcasting System
 Toray Industries
 Toshiba
 Toyo Engineering Corporation

Other companies with close ties to the Mitsui Group

 Abellio Greater Anglia – Mitsui owns 40% share of the British rail operator.
 West Midlands Trains - Mitsui owns 15% share of the British rail operator.
 BHP
 Columbia Asia
 Fujifilm
 IHH Healthcare Berhad – Mitsui owns 20.5% share capital in the company and is represented on its board.
 Ito-Yokado
 Kanebo (Kao Corporation)
 Komatsu
 Oji Paper Company - once had a transaction in its development on the purchase of several Mitsui subsidiaries by Oji.
 The Oriental Land Company (Keisei Electric Railway)
 Rio Tinto
 Sagami Railway
 Sims Metal – Mitsui owns 18% share capital in the company and is represented on its board.
 Sony
 Suntory - former subsidiary.
 Toyota - former subsidiary
 Vale
 Yamaha
 Yanmar
 RTV Pink

See also
 List of Japanese companies
 Mitsui & Co
 Mitsui family
 Mitsui Golden Glove Award
 Mitsui O.S.K. Lines
 Sumitomo Mitsui Financial Group

Citations

General sources 
 Hall, John Whitney (1970). Japan: From Prehistory to Modern Times. Delacorte Universal History no. XX. New York: Delacorte Press.  .
 Shinjō, Hiroshi (1962). History of the Yen: 100 Years of Japanese Money-economy. Kobe: Research Institute for Economics & Business Administration, Kōbe University.

External links 
 The Mitsui Public Relations Committee
 Mitsui Public Relations Committee: Member Companies
 Our Roots: Sakichi Toyoda and Toyota Industries Corporation backed by the former Mitsui & CO.: Forming the roots of our strong relationship with Toyota Motor Corporation today

 
Companies established in 1876
Conglomerate companies based in Tokyo
Japanese companies established in 1876
Keiretsu
Sumitomo Group
Zaibatsu